John Gordon (12 January 1886 – 1971) was a Scottish professional footballer who played in the Scottish League for Hibernian, Leith Athletic, St Bernard's and Forfar Athletic as a centre half. He also played in the Southern League for Brentford and Coventry City.

Career statistics

References 

Scottish footballers
Brentford F.C. players
Southern Football League players
Scottish Football League players
Association football central defenders
Hibernian F.C. players
People from Arbroath
Leith Athletic F.C. players
Coventry City F.C. players
Bathgate F.C. players
1886 births
1971 deaths
Bonnyrigg Rose Athletic F.C. players
St Bernard's F.C. players
Forfar Athletic F.C. players
Leeds United F.C. players
Footballers from Angus, Scotland